Firmicus is a genus of crab spiders that was first described by Eugène Louis Simon in 1895.

Species
 it contains seventeen species and two subspecies, found in Africa, Asia, Spain, and France:
Firmicus abnormis (Lessert, 1923) – South Africa
Firmicus arushae Caporiacco, 1947 – East Africa
Firmicus aurantipes Jézéquel, 1966 – Ivory Coast
Firmicus biguttatus Caporiacco, 1940 – Ethiopia
Firmicus bimaculatus (Simon, 1886) – Madagascar
Firmicus bipunctatus Caporiacco, 1941 – Ethiopia
Firmicus bivittatus Simon, 1895 – Spain, France, Algeria
Firmicus bragantinus (Brito Capello, 1866) (type) – West Africa, Congo, Angola, Sudan
Firmicus campestratus Simon, 1907 – West Africa, Congo
Firmicus c. faradjensis (Lessert, 1928) – Congo
Firmicus c. ogoueensis Simon, 1907 – Congo
Firmicus dewitzi Simon, 1899 – Egypt, Israel, Iran
Firmicus duriusculus Simon, 1903 – Vietnam
Firmicus haywoodae Jézéquel, 1964 – Ivory Coast
Firmicus insularis (Blackwall, 1877) – Seychelles
Firmicus lentiginosus (Simon, 1886) – Africa
Firmicus paecilipes Caporiacco, 1940 – Ethiopia
Firmicus strandi Caporiacco, 1947 – East Africa
Firmicus werneri Simon, 1906 – Uganda

In synonymy:
F. marginatus Simon, 1897 = Firmicus insularis (Blackwall, 1877)

See also
 List of Thomisidae species

References

Further reading

Araneomorphae genera
Thomisidae